On August 24, 2016, the body of 10-year-old Victoria Martens (August 23, 2006 – August 23, 2016) was found in an apartment building in Albuquerque, New Mexico. After responding to a 9-1-1 call regarding a domestic dispute, officers discovered Martens' dismembered remains partially wrapped in a burning blanket in her mother's apartment. The victim's mother, 35-year-old Michelle Martens; her boyfriend, 31-year-old Fabian Gonzales; and Gonzales' cousin, 31-year-old Jessica Kelley, were arrested at the scene and charged with first-degree murder, child abuse resulting in grievous bodily harm or death, kidnapping, tampering with evidence, and contributing to the delinquency of a minor. All three suspects pled not guilty in the state's court. On June 29, 2018, Michelle Martens pled guilty to one count of child abuse resulting in death. The same day, the Albuquerque Police Department announced a fourth unidentified male suspect was being sought in connection to the case based on DNA evidence recovered from the scene.

Background
Victoria Martens was born on August 23, 2006, in Albuquerque, New Mexico. She was a student at Petroglyph Elementary School in Albuquerque. Her mother, Michelle Martens, did not have a criminal record in New Mexico, but later told investigators she would seek men online to engage in sexual acts with her two children, including Victoria, while she allegedly watched for pleasure. The New Mexico Children, Youth, and Families Department (CYFD), located in the state capital, Santa Fe, had previously received five phone calls regarding the Martens' household, mostly from Michelle Martens herself, beginning in 2015. Michelle Martens allegedly met Fabian Gonzales on an internet dating service, Plenty Of Fish, about a month prior to the killing. Jessica Kelley had been released from prison only four days before the murder.

Circumstances of death
According to investigators, witnesses saw Jessica Kelley carrying Victoria Martens to the apartment at around 10 p.m. MDT on August 23. Later that night, neighbors reported hearing screaming coming from the apartment. Shortly after, at approximately 4:30 a.m. on August 24, Michelle Martens and Fabian Gonzales left the apartment and reported to neighbors that Kelley had attacked them with an iron. After responding to the 9-1-1 call, police entered the second-story apartment building where they saw smoke coming from behind the closed bathroom door. Upon opening the door, the responding officers discovered the dismembered body of Victoria Martens partially wrapped in a burning blanket. She was then pronounced dead at the scene. An autopsy revealed she had been sexually assaulted, strangled to death, and then stabbed and dismembered. Her body was then set on fire. Martens had been given alcohol and methamphetamine prior to her death, according to her mother, in order "to calm her down so [Fabian Gonzales and Jessica Kelley] could have sex with her." Investigators determined Victoria Martens died between 7:45 and 8:30 p.m. on August 23, her 10th birthday.

Investigation and trials
Michelle Martens, Fabian Gonzales, and Jessica Kelley were arrested and charged with the murder of Victoria Martens. The three suspects were held on a USD$1 million cash-only bond. Martens, Gonzales, and Kelley were arraigned on September 16, 2016. Initially co-defendants, prosecutors asked the court to try Martens, Gonzales, and Kelley in separate criminal trials. The motion was granted in June 2017.  They each pled not guilty. On August 14, 2017, Judge Charles Brown decided that Michelle Martens would be tried first on July 30, 2018. Gonzales would be second in October 2018 and then Kelley would go on trial in January 2019. The trials of Gonzales and Kelly were postponed until 2022. 

On June 29, 2018, Bernalillo County District Attorney Raúl Torrez announced that Michelle Martens accepted a plea bargain to one count of child abuse resulting in death. Torrez said in a press conference that most of the details regarding the case were "simply not true." During the conference, the Albuquerque Police Department announced that a fourth unidentified male suspect was sought in relation to the death of Victoria Martens based on unknown DNA evidence recovered from the scene. According to Torrez:
 4:25 p.m.: Victoria Martens gets off the bus & goes home. Michelle and Fabian aren’t present at this time.
 5:07 p.m.: Michelle & Fabian return to the apartment.
 6:05 p.m.: Victoria goes to gas station with Fabian.
 6:15 to 6:20 p.m.: Victoria and Fabian return to the apartment.
 6:30 p.m.: Michelle & Fabian leave and go to Paradise Hills.
 7:02 p.m.: Michelle & Fabian return to the apartment.
 7:05 p.m.: Victoria is seen alive by neighbors.
 7:06 p.m.: Michelle and Fabian leave again.
 7:38 p.m.: Michelle and Fabian are near Rio Bravo Boulevard and Coors Boulevard.
 7:59 p.m.: Michelle and Fabian are seen near Five Points and Bridge Boulevard.
 8:47 p.m.: Michelle and Fabian arrive at the apartment.
 8:48 p.m.: Eyewitnesses say Victoria’s body is seen being carried outside the apartment.

Torrez said this proves Martens and Gonzales were not present when the murder and rape occurred. Subsequently, Torrez announced nine of the charges against Fabian Gonzales including second-degree murder and criminal sexual penetration were dropped. Gonzales faced a series of charges including child abuse resulting in death and tampering with evidence of which he was found guilty. Michelle Martens is believed to have falsely confessed to actively participating in the murder. The plea bargain guarantees Martens will face 12–15 years in prison; however it is possible she could have her sentence cut in half since the charge is not classified as a serious violent offense. Michelle Martens will be sentenced after the conclusion of Gonzales' and Kelley's trials.

Internal investigation of the Albuquerque Police Department
On August 4, 2017, the Albuquerque Journal reported that an investigation by the Civilian Police Oversight Agency (CPOA) found that a spokesperson from the Albuquerque Police Department "did lie" to the newspaper about the police department's response to a CYFD referral concerning Victoria Martens prior to her death. In December 2016, a sergeant and a commander of the Crimes Against Children Unit told police command staff, including Chief of Police Gorden Eden and a department spokesman officer, that the Albuquerque Police had received referrals from the CYFD about Martens but did not investigate.

In late January 2017, two police spokespersons told the Albuquerque Journal that officers did investigate the referrals and stated that interviews with Victoria Martens and her mother had been conducted; however, this was revealed by the investigation to be false. In July 2017, the CPOA investigation discovered that one of the police spokespersons held correct information about the case but fabricated details in the January statements given to the Albuquerque Journal. Albuquerque's Citizen Police Oversight Agency voted for the officer, since removed from spokesperson duties, to be suspended for two weeks. However, Eden modified this to a one-day suspension arguing that there was no evidence the officer "intentionally lied". Due to the disagreement, the case will next be reviewed by an independent monitor overseeing the Albuquerque Police Department's reform.

Reactions
Eden called Victoria Martens's killing "the most gruesome act of evil I have ever seen in my career". Governor Susana Martinez called for a federal investigation. Then-Mayor Richard J. Berry tweeted: "We are heartbroken as we mourn the murder of beautiful 10yr old Victoria Martens. Give your kids an extra hug tonight. #justiceForVictoria".

A birthday memorial was held for Victoria Martens on August 29, 2016. Two months later, on October 29, a public funeral was held for her.

In August 2017, Martens's maternal grandparents filed a wrongful death lawsuit in the 2nd District Court against the City of Albuquerque and several named police officers. The lawsuit alleged that their failure to investigate a report that one of Michelle Martens' boyfriends tried to kiss Victoria was negligence that led to her murder and that Albuquerque "had in effect policies, practices, and customs that condoned and fostered the unlawful conduct of the [Albuquerque Police Department] Individual Defendants, and were a direct and proximate cause" of Martens's death. The lawsuit seeks policy changes and compensation for the Martens family.

See also
 Crime in New Mexico
 List of murdered American children

Notes

References

2016 in New Mexico
2016 murders in the United States
August 2016 crimes in the United States
Child abuse resulting in death
Child sexual abuse in the United States
Deaths by person in New Mexico
Deaths from asphyxiation
Drug-related deaths in New Mexico
Murder in New Mexico
History of Albuquerque, New Mexico
Incidents of violence against girls